Grenzdorf may refer to:

 Graniczna Wieś, a village in Pomeranian Voivodeship, in northern Poland
 Hraničky, a settlement located in Sudetenland, Czech Republic
 Grenzdorf (Ramin), a settlement in Ramin municipality in Mecklenburg-Vorpommern, Germany